Michel Soto Chalhoub is a civil engineer who pioneered modern practice in shock, vibration, and seismic design using energy dissipating devices [ref].  He developed his methodologies while at the University of California, Berkeley, where he earned his Ph.D. in dynamics and seismic design.

He focused his research and his product development projects on critical facilities that are needed to remain functional during and in the aftermath of a major tremor such as fire command centers, hospitals, and transportation facilities.  Chalhoub applied advanced structural dynamics to projects such as TITAN IV Solid Motor, Disney theme parks, and offshore docking cells.  Chalhoub became well known for his work on fluid-structure interaction as researchers, to-date, use his work as a historic reference on structures and fluids in some of the most seismically active countries such as Japan, Turkey, and Iran. He was awarded the Graduate Student Instructor Award at the University of California in 1988, and the Engineer of the Year Award at the Parsons Corporation in Pasadena in 1990 for pioneering work in applied dynamics to solve environmental problems.  His works in 1991 on wave motion and the effect of currents on ocean floor structures was adopted for the design of the Point Loma Outfall extension project in 1992 and 1993, a facility which became known as one of the longest and deepest in the world. A few years earlier, he had completed the design of docking cells subjected to wave and ice loading in Prudhoe Bay Alaska.

His projects include The Typhoon Lagoon in Disney World, Florida.  He performed the study of this theme park featuring a wave generator made of a twelve-cell prestressed concrete structure discharging in an artificial lagoon.  The water is released through steel gates, one at the bottom of each funnel-shaped cell, forming gravity waves that propagate across the lagoon and break on its shore.  A few years later, the idea was applied in Japan.

While at Parsons, Chalhoub chaired the committee on base isolation at the Structural Engineers Association of California (SEAOC) and developed the simplified design code on seismic design using shock absorbers which was introduced for the first time in the Uniform Building Code in 1990.  Simplified code formulas help engineers worldwide adopt and apply engineering concepts in their daily practice, providing effective design, yet without having to burden themselves with complex research derivations.  As a member of the Federal Emergency Management Agency, and as a registered Civil Engineer (P.E.) and Structural Engineer (S.E.) in the State of California, he worked as a chief engineer in disaster relief missions in the Loma Prieta earthquake, the Landers earthquake, and the Northridge earthquake, three major natural disasters that claimed lives and billions of dollars in property and public facility damage.

Following disaster relief missions in the USA and in other countries in Latin America, in Europe and the Middle East, Chalhoub became interested in issues of public concern especially as they relate to public health and safety.  He formalized his public service experience by earning a Master in Public Policy at the Kennedy School of Government, Harvard University, where he concentrated on Business-Government and International Development. His research then culminated in a policy analysis project for the Office of Technology Assessment on Public-Private Partnerships in the Commercialization of Environmental Technologies in which he addressed defense conversion at the tail of the Cold War.  His research studied how to transform military research results to find use in civilian applications to better serve society.  It was nominated for the Best Policy Analysis Exercise at Harvard in 1995.

References 

State of California, Board of Professional Engineers and Land Surveyors, License Lookup Page
University of California, Berkeley, CA, USA, Alumni Association.
Harvard University, Cambridge, USA, Alumni Association.
American Society of Civil Engineers.

American civil engineers
Living people
Year of birth missing (living people)
Harvard Kennedy School alumni
UC Berkeley College of Engineering alumni